Pacific Life Insurance Company is an American insurance company providing life insurance products, annuities, and mutual funds, and offers a variety of investment products and services to individuals, businesses, and pension plans.

History
Pacific Mutual Life was founded in 1868 by former California Governor, Leland Stanford in Sacramento, California. Stanford also was the first policy holder of the company. After Stanford died and his university (Stanford University) was strapped for money, his wife used the money from the policy to pay for professors. Starting in 1885, Pacific Mutual Life began issuing accident insurance, which was an innovative move for a life insurance company at the time. In 1906, Pacific Mutual Life merged with Conservative Life, a Los Angeles-based life insurance company. Following the 1906 San Francisco earthquake, Pacific Mutual Life's board of directors moved the company to Los Angeles. Since 2005, the company is domiciled in the state of Nebraska.

During the Great Depression, the company was hit with hard times and in 1936 in an effort to save both the policy holders and the company the insurance commissioner, Samuel L. Carpenter, encouraged the policy holders to become part owners of the company through mutualization. 

In 1955, Pacific Mutual Life became the first company west of the Mississippi River to use the brand new technology of Univac I. At Pacific Mutual Life's one-hundredth birthday the company celebrated with keynote speaker Ronald Reagan. In 1971, the company started Pacific Investment Management Company (PIMCO).  The company moved its headquarters to their current Newport Beach, California location in 1972 when management decided that Newport Beach would provide a higher standard of living for their families. 

In 1997, the company dropped mutual from its name, changing it to Pacific Life Insurance Company. This reflects the company structure's change from a mutual ownership to a mutual holding company structure. Also in 1997, the company adopted the humpback whale as symbol of the company because of the whale's persistence, performance, and strength.

In 2001, Pacific Life became majority shareholder of Aviation Capital Group (ACG) which owns, manages, and leases commercial jet aircraft internationally, and offers aircraft asset management services.
In August 2019, ACG said its equity value was $3.6 billion. In September 2019, it was reported that Pacific Life Insurance will sell its aviation unit for an estimated $3 billion to minority stockholder Tokyo Century Group, which owns 24.5% of Aviation Capital Group. The sale was completed on December 5, 2019.

On May 30, 2007, Pacific Asset Management was created. Pacific Asset Management offers advisory services and institutional fixed income management. Pacific Asset Management focuses on credit oriented fixed income. Pacific Asset Management's investment team manages bank loans, high yield corporate bonds, investment grade bonds and money market securities. Pacific Asset Management provides their clients the ability to invest with an entrepreneurial, boutique investment group focused on fundamental credit analysis and supported by the scale and infrastructure of Pacific Life. Pacific Asset Management currently manages registered investment companies under the Investment Company Act of 1940 as well as separate accounts.

The Pacific Life Foundation was established in 1984 and is headquartered in Newport Beach, CA. Together with Pacific Life, the Foundation has contributed more than $133 million to community and national nonprofit organizations. Grants are made to organizations that address a broad spectrum of social needs. The Pacific Life Foundation has announced plans to grant $8 million in charitable funding in 2022.

In 2017, Pacific Life launched Swell Investing, a subsidiary focused purely on impact investing. Swell was not able to achieve the scale needed to sustain investment independent operations. As a result, on August 30, 2019, Swell was closed.

In 2020, Pacific Life confirmed the addition of Louise Pentland, executive vice president and chief business and legal officer of PayPal, Inc., to the board of Pacific Mutual Holding Company, Pacific Life Insurance Company's ultimate parent company. She started her term as of 1 August 2020.

On April 1, 2022, Darryl Button assumed the role of president and CEO, becoming the 15th chief executive in Pacific Life's 154-year history, following Jim Morris' planned retirement.

References

External links
 
 

Insurance companies of the United States
Financial services companies established in 1868
1868 establishments in California
Companies based in Newport Beach, California
Financial services companies based in California